Dukat is an urban locality (an urban-type settlement) in the Omsukchansky District of Magadan Oblast, Russia, located  north of Magadan. Population:

History
In the mid of the 1960s, geologists from Omsukchan discovered a rich ore deposit of silver; and named the settlement of Dukat, founded in 1968, after the ducat, an old trade coin used in Europe. The status of urban-type settlement was assigned by the decision of the Magadan Regional Executive Committee of February 19, 1976.

Geography
Dukat is located in a valley between two mountains of the Omsukchan Range, Kolyma Highlands, 27 km west of Omsukchan, the raion's seat and the nearest populated place. It is 30 km from Omsukchan Airport and 45 from the ghost town of Galimy.

Economy

The town is known for its gold mine, one of the largest in Russia, located few km west of the town.

Gallery

See also
Omsukchan
List of urban localities in the Russian Far East

References

External links

Dukat on geographic.org
Dukat weather on worldweatheronline.com

Urban-type settlements in Magadan Oblast